Able Seaman Thomas Raymond Kelly    (19 March 1928 – 18 March 1947, Bay of Biscay) was a Northern Irish sailor in the British Merchant Navy who was posthumously awarded the George Cross for the courage he displayed in the Bay of Biscay, when he lost his own life saving people from drowning during a storm.

Known as Raymond Kelly, he was born in Newry, County Down, the eldest of six children. He had two brothers and three sisters. His father, Robert Kelly, was also a seaman and died at age 37. During the Second World War, Kelly left school at age 14, and in May 1942 he joined the SS Rowan.

He was serving on board the S.S. Empire Plover when a nearby vessel, the S.S. Famagusta, began to founder in a storm.  The Empire Plover responded to the S.O.S. but a lifeboat launched by the stricken vessel capsized, throwing its ten occupants into the water.  As the men of the Empire Plover lowered ropes and two crew members climbed down the scrambling nets to assist, Kelly swam with a line to the people struggling in the turbulent water and rescued a badly injured officer. He returned again to drag another man to safety but on his third foray he and the woman he was rescuing were swamped by a wave and disappeared. Five of the lifeboat's occupants were rescued in all.

His award was announced in the London Gazette of 6 February 1948, with the following citation:

References

1928 births
1947 deaths
British recipients of the George Cross
British Merchant Navy personnel
People from Newry
Deaths due to shipwreck at sea